Season 2013–14 was the 130th football season in which Dumbarton competed at a Scottish national level, entering the Scottish Football League for the 108th time, the Scottish Cup for the 119th time, the Scottish League Cup for the 67th time and the Scottish Challenge Cup for the 23rd time.

Overview 
The 2013–14 season was Dumbarton's second consecutive season in the second tier of Scottish football - the Scottish Championship, having been promoted from the Scottish Second Division at the end of the 2011–12 season.

Following Ian Murray's appointment which brought about an amazing transformation in Dumbarton's fortunes the previous season, it would be more of the same as far as this season was concerned.  Indeed, at one point there was a chance that Dumbarton would challenge for a play-off place for the Premier Division.  As it was, in the end, a very creditable 5th place was achieved.

In the Scottish Cup, there was more good news as Dumbarton would have their best cup run in almost 40 years, and would only lose out to Premier Division Aberdeen by the only goal after a tight fought match.

In the League Cup, after disposing of Albion Rovers in the first round, it would be Premier Division Dundee United that would advance, but only after a close match was lost by the odd goal in five.

Finally, despite the other successes, it was no real surprise that the League Challenge Cup saw yet another first round exit, this time to Stranraer.

Locally, in the Stirlingshire Cup, Falkirk would be the victors over Dumbarton in the semi final tie.

Results & fixtures

Pre season

SPFL Championship

Ramsden Cup

Scottish League Cup

Scottish Cup

Stirlingshire Cup

Player statistics

|}

Transfers

Players in

Players out

Trivia
 The League match against Queen of the South on 7 December marked Bryan Prunty's 100th appearance for Dumbarton in all national competitions - the 134th Dumbarton player to reach this milestone.
 The League match against Hamilton on 1 February marked Scott Agnew's 100th appearance for Dumbarton in all national competitions - the 135th Dumbarton player to reach this milestone.

See also
 2013–14 in Scottish football

References

External links
Alistair McKerracher (Dumbarton Football Club Historical Archive)
Scottish Football Historical Archive

Dumbarton F.C. seasons
Scottish football clubs 2013–14 season